Stawski (feminine: Stawska; plural: Stawscy) is a Polish surname. It is related to a number of surnames in other languages.

Notable people with the surname include:
 Alfons Stawski (born 1945), Polish boxer
 Axel Stawski (born 1950/51), American billionaire real estate developer
 Ben Stawski (born 1990), English badminton player

Related surnames

See also
 

Polish-language surnames